Fritz Nachmann (born 16 August 1929) is a West German former luger who competed during the 1950s and the 1960s. He was born in Kreuth. He won the bronze medal in the men's doubles event at the 1968 Winter Olympics in Grenoble. Nachmann also won five medals at the FIL World Luge Championships with four medals in men's doubles (gold: FIL World Luge Championships 1957, FIL World Luge Championships 1958; silver: FIL World Luge Championships 1962, bronze: FIL World Luge Championships 1955) and one medal in men's singles (gold: FIL World Luge Championships 1963). He also won a silver medal in the men's singles event at the 1967 FIL European Luge Championships in Königssee, West Germany.

References

 

1929 births
Living people
German male lugers
Lugers at the 1968 Winter Olympics
Olympic bronze medalists for West Germany
Olympic medalists in luge
Medalists at the 1968 Winter Olympics
Lugers at the 1964 Winter Olympics
Olympic lugers of the United Team of Germany
People from Miesbach (district)
Sportspeople from Upper Bavaria